Events from the year 1792 in art.

Events
 Ozias Humphry is appointed Portrait Painter in Crayons (i.e., pastels) to King George III of Great Britain.
 François-André Vincent becomes a professor at the Académie royale de peinture et de sculpture in Paris.
 Nationalmuseum in Stockholm, Sweden, founded as the Kungliga Museet ("Royal Museum").

Works

 Richard Cosway – Portrait miniature of George, Prince of Wales
 Jacques-Louis David – Portrait of Madame Marie-Louise Trudaine
 Samuel Jennings – Liberty Displaying the Arts and Sciences
 Alexander Kucharsky – Louis-Charles, Prince Royal of France
 George Stubbs
 A Couple of Foxhounds
 Rhinoceros
 John Trumbull
 Alexander Hamilton
 General George Washington at Trenton
 Utamaro – Famous Beauties of Edo, Ten Learned Studies of Women and Ten Types of Women's Physiognomies (print series begun)

Births
 February 19 – Lucie Ingemann, née Mandix, Danish religious painter (died 1868)
 February 24 – István Ferenczy, Hungarian sculptor (died 1856)
 June 16 – John Linnell, English landscape painter (died 1882)
 June 26 – Christian Albrecht Jensen, Danish painter (died 1870)
 August 9
 Alvan Fisher, United States landscape and genre painter (died 1863)
 Charles-François Lebœuf, French sculptor (died 1865)
 August 12 – Hans Harder, Danish painter and drawing master (died 1873)
 August 30 – Alexis Joseph Depaulis, French sculptor and medallist (died 1867)
 September 1 – Chester Harding, American portrait painter (died 1866)
 October 31 – Jean-Baptiste Roman, French sculptor (died 1835)
 December 17 – George Hayter, English portrait painter (died 1871)
 December 20 – Nicolas Toussaint Charlet, French designer and painter, especially of military subjects (died 1845)
 date unknown
 Arnoldus Bloemers, Dutch painter of flowers, fruit, and animals (died 1844)
 Peter Andreas Brandt, Norwegian painter and illustrator (died 1862)
 Carl Georg Enslen, Austrian painter (died 1866)
 Ferdinand Wolfgang Flachenecker, German painter (died 1847)
 James Arthur O'Connor, Irish landscape painter (died 1841)
 James Pollard, British painter and aquatint engraver especially of coach, fox hunting and equine scenes (died 1867)
 Ulla Stenberg, Swedish damask maker (died 1858)
 William Guy Wall, American painter of Irish birth (died 1864)
 Thomas Wyon, English engraver of medals (died 1817)
 1792/1793: George Mills, British sculptor, engraver and medallist (died 1824)

Deaths
 February 1 – Nicolas-Guy Brenet, French historical painter (born 1728)
 February 21 – Jacob Schnebbelie, English illustrator and engraver (born 1760)
 February 23 – Sir Joshua Reynolds, English painter, specializing in portraits (born 1723)
 March 3 – Robert Adam, Scottish-born architect and interior designer (born 1728)
 May 7 – Aert Schouman, Dutch painter, glass engraver and art dealer (born 1710)
 December 4 – Antonio Ponz, Spanish painter (born 1725)
 December 12 – William Hoare, English painter, noted for his pastels (born 1707)
 December 17 – Gottlieb Welté, German etcher and landscape painter (born 1745/1749)
 date unknown
 Francesco Appiani, Italian painter of the late-Baroque period, active mainly in Rome and Perugia (born 1704)
 Manuel de la Cruz, Spanish painter (born 1750)
 Anna Maria Mengs, German portrait painter in pastel and miniature (born 1751)
 Pietro Scalvini, Italian painter (born 1718)
 Katsukawa Shunshō, Japanese painter and printmaker in the ukiyo-e style (born 1726)

References

 
Years of the 18th century in art
1790s in art